The 1908 Delaware football team was an American football team that represented Delaware College (later renamed the University of Delaware) as an independent during the 1908 college football season. In its first year under head coach William McAvoy, the team compiled a 3–4–1 record.

Schedule

References

Delaware
Delaware Fightin' Blue Hens football seasons
Delaware Football